USS Laub may refer to the following ships of the United States Navy:

 , a  commissioned in 1919 and transferred to the Royal Navy in 1940 as HMS Burwell
 , a  commissioned in 1942 and decommissioned in 1946

United States Navy ship names